Under Electric Clouds is a 2015 Russian sci-fi drama film directed by Aleksei Alekseivich German. It was screened in the main competition section of the 65th Berlin International Film Festival where it won the Silver Bear for Outstanding Artistic Contribution for Cinematography. It also earned German the award for Achievement in Directing at the 9th Asia Pacific Screen Awards.

Cast
 Louis Franck as Petr
 Merab Ninidze as Nikolai
 Viktoria Korotkova as Sasha
 Chulpan Khamatova as Valya
 Viktor Bugakov as Danya
 Karim Pakachakov as Karim
 Konstantin Zeliger as Marat
 Anastasiya Melnikova as Irina
 Piotr Gasowski as Uncle Borya

References

External links
 

2015 films
2010s science fiction drama films
Russian science fiction drama films
2010s Russian-language films
Films directed by Aleksei Alekseivich German
Silver Bear for outstanding artistic contribution